Yenepoya (Deemed to be University), formerly Yenepoya University, is an institute of higher education, deemed to be university, located in Kuthar, Deralakatte, Mangalore, Karnataka, India. It was established in 1999. Yenepoya institute of Arts, Science, Commerce,and Management 

Yenepoya (Deemed to be University) has been recognised by University Grants Commission, New Delhi, India under 12(B) of the UGC Act, 1956 (www.ugc.ac.in).

Yenepoya Medical College 
Yenepoya Medical College is on the outskirts of Mangalore city in the Panchayat of Derlakatte. The college was established in 1999. Post-graduate courses were commenced in 2005. The M.B.B.S. (Bachelor of Medicine & Bachelor of Surgery) course is of 4.5 years plus 1 one year mandatory internship as per set standards of the National Medical Commission for India. The courses are mainly oriented for earning a degree.

Courses offered for MS/MD (PG medical courses):

MD (General Medicine, Paediatrics, Pathology, TB & Chest, Forensic Medicine and Toxicology (three-year programme))
MS (OBG, Orthopaedics, General surgery, Ophthalmology, ENT)

Yenepoya Dental College 

The B.D.S. (Bachelor of Dental Surgery) course runs for four years, followed by a one-year internship. The examination and award of degree are regulated as per standards of Indian Dental Council.

The pre-clinical departments are housed in the academic block with state-of-the-art dental clinics covering all dental specialties with more than 300 dental chairs attached to the college. The Yenepoya Dental College is headed by Dr.Akhter Husain.

Post-graduate courses 

MDS (Master of Dental Surgery) courses are normal three years. The examinations and awarding of degrees are regulated by Yenepoya University.

Centre for Ethics
Yenepoya University has a Centre For Ethics that conducts structured academic programs in bioethics such as Postgraduate Diploma in Bioethics & Medical Ethics (PGDBEME), Postgraduate Diploma in Clinical Ethics (PGDCE), choice-based course in Environmental Ethics and Intensive Summer Workshop in Ethics and Research (I-SWEAR) for training of ethics committee members and researchers. ( Add Citation )

The centre hosts the Yenepoya University Institutional Ethics Committee that is recognised by the DCGI. The centre mentors many institutions for training ethics committee members.

The Centre was started in 2011. The Centre runs MSc in Research Ethics course which is funded by an NIH Grant.

Hostels 

Yenepoya University has two guest houses for accommodation - Meridyen and Gardeyenia.

Rankings

The university was ranked 97 among universities in India by the National Institutional Ranking Framework (NIRF) in 2022 and in the 101–150 band overall.

Notable alumni 
Dr. Edmond Fernandes, Founder - CHD Group & US Department of State Alumnus.

References

External links

 http://www.yenepoya.edu.in

Educational institutions established in 2008
Universities in Mangalore
Deemed universities in Karnataka
2008 establishments in Karnataka